Harold Frederick Bubser (September 28, 1895 – June 22, 1959) was a Major League Baseball player for the Chicago White Sox. He received three plate appearances for the 1922 Chicago White Sox as a pinch hitter.

External links

1895 births
1959 deaths
Chicago White Sox players
Cedar Rapids Rabbits players
Rockford Rox players
Kalamazoo Celery Pickers players
Kalamazoo Kazoos players
Decatur Commodores players